The term striped uniform may refer to:
 a striped prison uniform,
 sports clothing, especially in soccer (vertical stripes) and rugby (horizontal stripes).